The Agency for French Education Abroad, or Agency for French Teaching Abroad, (abbreviation: AEFE), is a national public agency under the administration of the Ministry of Foreign Affairs of France that assures the quality of schools teaching the French national curriculum outside France. The AEFE has 495 schools in its worldwide network, with French as the primary language of instruction in most schools.

The AEFE head office is in the 14th arrondissement of Paris.

Curriculum
Schools are either directly managed (gestion directe), contracted (conventionné) or accredited (homologué). The schools provide an education based on the French national curriculum for pupils of various cultures from preschool through secondary school, and some receive substantial financial support from the French government. The schools provide an education leading to a baccalauréat, and students have access to all other French schools at their own educational level.

In addition, the schools have a curriculum linked to the individual countries in which they are established.  The Lycée Français de San Francisco (formerly Lycée Français La Pérouse) and the International School of the Peninsula in San Francisco, for example, include American History and English Literature in its program, and the Lycée Français de Caracas in Venezuela includes History of Venezuela (ICV) from 6th to 9th grade.

Schools are located throughout Europe, the Americas, Asia and Africa. Most of their pupils are children of French expatriates but they also include many regular pupils attracted by the quality of schooling provided. In any given academic year, around 160,000 students study in these schools.

School names
While there are no public guidelines for naming schools in the AEFE network, they tend to have some similarities. A school that follows the French curriculum through secondary school (high school in the United States and sixth form college in Great Britain) is often named a Lycée Français and prepares students for the French baccalauréat. Schools that combine the local and French curricula are often called French-American or Franco-Mexicain schools. Schools that offer the International Baccalaureate are often called International School or Lycée International.

Schools operated by or receiving funding from AEFE

 Abu Dhabi, Lycée Louis-Massignon
 Abu Dhabi, Lycée Français Théodore-Monod
 Accra,  Lycée Français Jacques Prevert d’Accra
 Alicante, Lycée Français d'Alicante Pierre Deschamps
 Amman, École Française d'Amman
 Amsterdam, École Française Amsterdam
 Andorra la Vella, Lycée Comte de Foix
 Ankara, Lycée Français Charles de Gaulle, Ankara
 Alexandria, Lycée Français d'Alexandrie
 Asunción, Lycée Français International Marcel Pagnol
 Athens, Lycée Franco-Hellénique Eugène Delacroix
 Austin, Austin International School
 Bangkok, Lycée Français International de Bangkok
 Barcelona, Lycée Français de Barcelone
 Beijing, Lycée Français International de Pekin
 Beirut, Grand Lycée Franco-Libanais
 Beirut, Lycée Franco-Libanais Verdun
 Beirut, Lycée Abdel Kader
 Berlin, Collège français-Lycée français
 Berlin, Collège Voltaire
 Berkeley, California École Bilingue de Berkeley
 Bilbao, Lycee Francais de Bilbao
 Bobo Dioulasso, École Française André Malraux 
 Bogotá, Lycée Français Louis Pasteur
 Bonn, École Charles de Gaulle - Adenauer
 Boston, International School of Boston
 Brussels, Lycée Français Jean Monnet
 Bucharest, Lycée Français Anna de Noailles Bucarest
 Budapest, Gustave Eiffel French School of Budapest 
 Buenos Aires, Lycée Franco-Argentin Jean Mermoz
 Cairo, Lycée Français du Caire
 Calgary, Lycée Louis Pasteur
 Cali, Colombia Lycée Français Paul Valéry de Cali 
 California, International School of the Peninsula
 Cape Town, École François Le Vaillant
 Caracas, Lycée Français de Caracas
 Casablanca, Lycée Lyautey
 Chicago, Lycée Français de Chicago
 Concepción, Lycée français Charles de Gaulle
 Conakry, Lycée français Albert Camus
 Copenhagen, Lycée Français Prins Henrik
 Curicó, Lycée français Jean Mermoz
Dakar, Lycée français Jean Mermoz de Dakar
 Dallas, Dallas International School 
 Damascus, Lycée Français Charles de Gaulle
 Dhaka, École Française Internationale de Dacca
 Delhi, Lycée Français de Delhi
 Doha, Lycée Français de Doha
 Doha, Lycée Franco-Qatarien Voltaire
 Douala, Lycée Français Dominique Savio
 Dubai, Lycée Français Georges-Pompidou
 Dubai, Lycée Français International
 Dublin, Lycée Français d'Irlande
 Düsseldorf, Lycée français de Düsseldorf
 Guadalajara, Lycée Français de Guadalajara - Colegio Franco Mexicano
 Guatemala, Lycée Jules Verne
 Habbouch (Lebanon), Lycée Franco-Libanais Habbouche-Nabatieh
 Frankfurt, Lycée Français Victor Hugo
 Hamburg, Lycée Français Antoine de Saint-Exupéry de Hambourg
 Hanoi, Lycée français Alexandre Yersin
 Heidelberg, Ecole Pierre et Marie Curie Heidelberg 
 Hong Kong, Lycée Français International Victor Segalen
 Houston, Awty International School
 Houston, Lycée International de Houston
 Islamabad, École Française Alfred Foucher
 Istanbul, Lycée français Pierre Loti
 Jerusalem, Lycée Français de Jérusalem
 Johannesburg, Lycée français Jules Verne
 Kabul, Lycée Esteqlal and Lycée Malalaï
 Kyiv, Lycée français Anne-de-Kiev
 Košice, Lycée bilingue M.R. Štefánik
 Kuwait City, Lycée Français de Koweït
 Kuala Lumpur, Lycée Français LFKL
 La Paz, Lycée Franco-Bolivien Alcides D'Orbigny
 Lagos, Lycée Français Louis PASTEUR de Lagos
 Lima, Lycée Franco-Péruvien
 Lisbon, Lycée Français Charles-Lepierre
 London, Lycée Français Charles de Gaulle
 London, Lycée International de Londres Winston Churchill
 Los Angeles, Lycée International de Los Angeles (LILA)
 Los Angeles, Lycée Français de Los Angeles
 Luxembourg, Lycée français Vauban   
 Madagascar, Écoles et Lycée Français de Tananarive
 Madagascar, Lycée La Clairefontaine
 Madrid, Lycée Français de Madrid
 Málaga, Lycée Français de Málaga
 Mali, Lycée Français Liberté de Bamako
 Mali, Groupe Scolaire Les Angelots
 Managua, Lycée Franco-Nicaraguayen Victor Hugo
 Manama, École Française de Bahreïn
 Mauritius, Lycée Labourdonnais
 Mauritius, Lycée des Mascareignes
 Meknes, Lycée Paul-Valéry
 Mexico City, Lycée Franco-Mexicain
Milan, Lycée Stendhal de Milan
 Montevideo, Lycée Français de Montevideo
 Montreal, Collège International Marie de France
 Montreal, Collège Stanislas Montréal
 Mumbai, Lycée Français International de Mumbai
 Munich, Lycée Jean Renoir de Munich
 Murcia, Lycée français André-Malraux de Murcie  
 Muscat, École Française de Mascate
 Nairobi, Lycée Denis Diderot
 New Orleans, Lycée Français de la Nouvelle-Orléans
 New Jersey, The French American Academy
 New York, French-American School of New York (located in suburban Westchester County).
 New York, Ecole Internationale de New York
 Nicosia École Française Arthur Rimbaud
 Oslo, Lycée français René Cassin
 Osorno, Lycée français Claude Gay 
 Ottawa, Lycée Paul Claudel 
 Ouagadougou, Lycée français Saint-Exupéry 
 Philadelphia, French International School of Philadelphia
 Phnom Penh, Lycée français René Descartes de Phnom Penh 
 Pondicherry, Lycée français de Pondichéry
 Porto, École Française Marius Latour
 Pretoria, École Miriam Makeba Annexe du lycée français de Johannesburg
 Port-au-Prince, Lycée Alexandre Dumas
 Port Vila, Lycée Français Jean-Marie Gustave Le Clézio 
 Princeton, New Jersey, French American School of Princeton
 Providence, Rhode Island, French-American School of Rhode Island 
 Quebec City, Collège Stanislas Annexe de Québec
 Rabat, Lycée Descartes
 Rio de Janeiro, Lycée Molière
 Rome, Lycée Chateaubriand
 San Francisco, French American International School
 San Francisco, Lycée Français La Pérouse
San José, Costa Rica, Lycée Franco Costarricien
 Santa Cruz de la Sierra, Ecole Française de Santa Cruz
 Santiago (Vitacura commune), Lycée français Antoine de Saint-Exupéry 
 Santo Domingo, Lycée Français de Saint domingue, 
 Seoul, Lycée Français de Séoul
 Shanghai, Lycée Français de Shanghai,
 Singapore, French School of Singapore,
 Sofia, Lycée Victor Hugo de Sofia, 
 Stockholm, Lycée Français de Stockholm
 Sydney, Lycée Condorcet The French School of Sydney
 Taipei, Taipei European School
Tangier, Lycée Regnault
 Tegucigalpa, Lycée Franco-hondurien
 The Hague, Lycée Français Vincent van Gogh, 
 Thessaloniki, École Française de Thessalonique
 Tokyo, Lycée Franco-Japonais de Tokyo 
 Toronto, Lycée Français de Toronto 
 Toronto, Toronto French School 
 Tunis, Lycée Pierre Mendès France
 Tunis (La Marsa), Lycée Gustave Flaubert
 Valencia, Lycée Français de Valence 
 Vancouver, École Française Internationale de Vancouver
 Vienna, Lycée Français de Vienne
 Vilnius, Lycée International Français de Vilnius
 Viña del Mar, Lycée français Jean d'Alembert
 Yaoundé, Lycée Français Fustel de Coulanges
 Warsaw, Lycée français de Varsovie René Goscinny 
 Washington, Lycée Rochambeau
 Zurich, Lycée Francais Marie Curie de Zurich

See also

 Education in France
 Central Agency for German Schools Abroad (ZfA) - The German equivalent of the AEFE

External links
 Agency for French Education Abroad

References

 
Education in France
Language education organizations
Francophonie
International Baccalaureate schools
School accreditors
Associations of schools
Language immersion